Outrigger canoeing at the 1999 South Pacific Games was held from 5–10 June 1999 at Matapang Beach, Tumon Bay in Guam. There were six events for the "Galaide II" OC6 canoe (G6) and four events for the Va'a 1 rudderless OC1 (V1). Tahiti dominated the competition winning all ten gold medals.

Medal summary

Medal table

Men's Results

Women's Results

Participating countries
Eight countries were entered in the outrigger canoeing events at the 1999 Games:

 Micronesia

References

Outrigger canoeing at the Pacific Games
1999 Pacific Games
Pacific Games